Okabena Creek is a  waterway in southern Minnesota.  It is a tributary, via the short Diversion Creek, of Heron Lake, the outlet of which flows to the Des Moines River.  Okabena Creek begins in Worthington, Minnesota, connecting by a ditch to the outlet of Okabena Lake, then flows northeast past the towns of Brewster and Okabena to the Heron Lake/South Heron Lake system.

Okabena is the Sioux-language word meaning "Heron Lake".

See also
List of rivers of Minnesota

References

Rivers of Minnesota
Rivers of Nobles County, Minnesota
Rivers of Jackson County, Minnesota